Po Nga is one of the 19 constituencies in the Tai Po District.

The constituency returns one district councillor to the Tai Po District Council, with an election every four years.

Po Nga constituency is loosely based on Po Nga Court and part of the Tai Wo Estate in Tai Wo with estimated population of 17,451.

Councillors represented

Election results

2010s

2000s

1990s

References

Tai Po
Constituencies of Hong Kong
Constituencies of Tai Po District Council
1994 establishments in Hong Kong
Constituencies established in 1994